Zum Weinberg is a traditional wine tavern founded in 1354 and located in the historic center of Wismar city, Mecklenburg-Vorpommern federal state in northern Germany. 

In 20th century the restaurant was reconstructed and the guest rooms were created from the hall and on the first floor.

See also 
List of oldest companies

References

External links 
Homepage in German
Listed as one of 10 oldest bars and restaurants in the world

Wine bars
Restaurants in Germany
Hotels in Germany
Companies established in the 14th century
14th-century establishments in the Holy Roman Empire